Newcastle Link Road is a limited-access road in New South Wales linking the interchange of Pacific Motorway and Hunter Expressway at Cameron Park, to Wallsend in western Newcastle. It is designated part of route A15.

Route
Newcastle Link Road commences at the interchange of Pacific Motorway and Hunter Expressway northwest of Cameron Park and heads in an easterly direction as a single carriageway, four-lane road, with a thin concrete divider separating traffic, to end at Wallsend on the western edge of suburban Newcastle, completed in 1993. Traffic, and route A15, continues east past Wallsend as Thomas Street to connect directly into central Newcastle.

While the road has a 90 km/h speed limit, there are two roundabouts along the road (previously four prior to 2013). The easternmost roundabout leads nowhere as the road connecting to the roundabout, Transfield Avenue, has not yet been constructed, and was intended to connect to new housing developments north of Glendale.

History
As part of the construction of the Palmers Road to Minmi section of Sydney–Newcastle Freeway (now Pacific Motorway), Newcastle Link Road was constructed through former coal mining lands west of Newcastle and opened to traffic in December 1993. It improves connectivity between Newcastle and Sydney via the freeway and relieves traffic on the Pacific Highway via Charlestown, Belmont and Swansea.

The passing of the Roads Act of 1993 through the Parliament of New South Wales updated road classifications and the way they could be declared within New South Wales. Under this act, Main Road 82 (from the intersection of Tudor and Parry Streets in Newcastle to the intersection with Newcastle Inner City Bypass and Newcastle Road in Jesmond) was extended west along Newcastle Road, Thomas Street and Newcastle Link Road to the interchange with the Sydney-Newcastle (F3) Freeway (today the Pacific Motorway) near Cameron Park, on 22 November 1996. The road today, as part of Main Road 82, still retains this declaration.

As part of the construction of Hunter Expressway, the interchange of Pacific Motorway and Newcastle Link Road was upgraded with the addition of three new bridges next to the original single bridge, maintaining the previous grade separation conditions and directly connecting into Hunter Expressway.

In preparation of the increased demand on Newcastle Link Road from the construction of Hunter Expressway, the intersections with Cameron Park Drive / Woodford Street and Lake Road / Thomas Street were upgraded from roundabouts to become traffic light controlled in 2013. In the same year, the route was also signed with the A15 number to reflect the increased status of this route into Newcastle.

Interchanges

References

Highways in New South Wales
Newcastle, New South Wales
Roads in the Hunter Region
City of Lake Macquarie